Craíbas is a municipality located in the western of the Brazilian state of Alagoas. Its population is 24,309 (2020) and its area is 275 km².

References

Municipalities in Alagoas